The 1996 Greenlandic Men's Football Championship was the 26th edition of the Greenlandic Men's Football Championship. The final round was held in Nuuk. It was won by B-67 Nuuk for the third time in its history.

Final round

Pool 1

Pool 2

Playoffs

Semi-finals

Seventh-place match

Fifth-place match

Third-place match

Final

See also
Football in Greenland
Football Association of Greenland
Greenland national football team
Greenlandic Men's Football Championship

References

Greenlandic Men's Football Championship seasons
Green
Green
Foot